Project S may refer to:

 Project S, an alternative title for the movie Once a Cop
 Project S: The Series, a 2017 Thai television series